Sätra metro station is a station on the red line of Stockholm metro, located in the district of Sätra. The station was opened on 16 May 1965 as the southwest terminus of the extension from Örnsberg. On 1 March 1967, the line was extended to Skärholmen.

References

Red line (Stockholm metro) stations
Railway stations opened in 1965